Zilchogyra is a genus of air-breathing land snail, a terrestrial pulmonate gastropod mollusk in the family Helicodiscidae. Zilchogyra miocenica is the first Miocene record of the genus.

Species
Species within the genus Zilchogyra include:
 Zilchogyra paulistana

References

Helicodiscidae
Taxonomy articles created by Polbot